A provincial forest is a type of government-owned land in Canada, controlled by one of Canada's ten provinces.  The nature of their management varies between the provinces.

Provincial control of forest lands 

The largest class of landowners in Canada are the provincial governments, who hold all unclaimed land in their jurisdiction in the name of the Crown (Crown Lands). Over 90% of the sprawling boreal forest of Canada is provincial Crown land. Provincial lands account for 60% of the area of the province of Alberta, 94% of the land in British Columbia, 95% of Newfoundland and Labrador, and 48% of New Brunswick.

Provincial forest lands by province 
 Alberta

 Manitoba

Saskatchewan

See also
 Forests of Canada

References 

Forests of Canada
Types of formally designated forests